Similkameen Elementary Secondary School is a part of School District 53 in the Similkameen Okanagan Valley. This school is a combined high school and elementary school, with about 300 students enrolled from grade five to twelve. Staff number approximately 40. Students attending this school are primarily from the surrounding towns of Keremeos, Cawston, Hedley, and Olalla.

Sports available at Similkameen include cross country for boys and girls, soccer (co-ed), basketball (co-ed), and golf (co-ed), plus volleyball for girls. The school is ranked single A by size.

References

External links 
http://www.sd53.bc.ca/sess/
http://issuu.com/blackpress/docs/i20130228070322743

Educational institutions in Canada with year of establishment missing
Elementary schools in British Columbia
High schools in British Columbia
Similkameen Country